Naples in Green and Blue (Italian:Napoli verde-blu) is a 1935 Italian musical film directed by Armando Fizzarotti and starring Lina Gennari, Ellen Meis and Silvio Orsini. Although set in Naples, the film was shot in a studio in Rome. It was a low-budget revue, featuring a series of popular performers.

Cast
 Lina Gennari
 Ellen Meis 
 Silvio Orsini 
 Armando Gill 
 Agostino Salvietti 
 Carlo Buti 
 Nicola Maldacea 
 Salvatore Papaccio
 Giuseppe Ricagno 
 La Gemmati 
 Anna Maria 
 Girolamo Gaudiosi

References

Bibliography 
 Liehm, Mira. Passion and Defiance: Film in Italy from 1942 to the Present. University of California Press, 1984.
 Marlow-Mann, Alex. The New Neapolitan Cinema. Edinburgh University Press, 2011.

External links 
 

1935 films
Italian musical films
Italian black-and-white films
1935 musical films
1930s Italian-language films
Films directed by Armando Fizzarotti
Films set in Naples
1930s Italian films